Benny Staffan Malmsten (born October 22, 1970 in Katrineholm) is a Swedish sprint canoer who competed in the mid-1990s. At the 1996 Summer Olympics in Atlanta, he finished eighth in the K-2 1000 m event while being eliminated in the semifinals of the K-2 500 m event.

References
 Sports-Reference.com profile

1970 births
Canoeists at the 1996 Summer Olympics
Living people
Olympic canoeists of Sweden
Swedish male canoeists
People from Katrineholm Municipality
Sportspeople from Södermanland County